Hired to Kill is an action and adventure film in which a group of mercenaries posing as a fashion modeling company attempt to release a captive rebel leader from a dictatorial régime. The film was first released to video in South Korea on 28 April 1990.

Plot
Mercenary Frank Ryan (Brian Thompson) is summoned by US agent Thomas (George Kennedy) and given the assignment of releasing rebel leader Petros Rallis, (José Ferrer) who is being held prisoner in the country of Cypra, run by President Michael Bartos (Oliver Reed). To do this, Ryan assembles a group of female mercenaries and poses as a photo modeling company for a photography assignment. They are given a military guard for the photo-shoot but the guards are overcome by the group and together with Bartos' assistant Ana, (Michelle Moffett) they link up with other rebels, storm the prison where Rallis is being held and make their escape. At this time, Ryan realizes that he has been duped and finally confronts Thomas.

Cast
Brian Thompson as Frank Ryan
Oliver Reed as Michael Bartos
George Kennedy as Thomas
José Ferrer as Rallis
Michelle Moffett as Ana
Barbara Niven as Sheila (credited as Barbara Lee Alexander)
Jordana Capra as Joanna
Kendall Conrad as Daphne
Kim Lonsdale as Sivi
Jude Mussetter as Dahlia
Penelope Reed as Katrina
David Sawyer as Louis
Antzela Gerekou as Tara (credited as Angela Gerekou)

Production
The filming took place mainly on the Greek island of Corfu. Stuntman Clint C. Carpenter was killed when a stunt involving a helicopter went wrong.

References

External links
 

1990 films
Films directed by Nico Mastorakis
Films shot in Corfu
1990s English-language films